Paul Edward Hoganson (born November 12, 1949) is a Canadian former professional ice hockey goaltender who played two games in the National Hockey League and 143 games in the World Hockey Association. Hoganson played with the Pittsburgh Penguins, Los Angeles Sharks, Michigan Stags, Baltimore Blades, New England Whalers, Cincinnati Stingers, and Indianapolis Racers.

As a youth, Hoganson played in the 1962 Quebec International Pee-Wee Hockey Tournament with the Humer Valley team. Born in Toronto, Ontario, Hoganson is a cousin with Dale Hoganson.

References

External links

1949 births
Living people
Baltimore Clippers players
Canadian ice hockey goaltenders
Cincinnati Stingers players
Greensboro Generals (SHL) players
Hampton Gulls (AHL) players
Ice hockey people from Toronto
Indianapolis Racers players
Los Angeles Sharks players
Michigan Stags players
New England Whalers players
Pittsburgh Penguins draft picks
Pittsburgh Penguins players
Tucson Rustlers players